"I Can Only Imagine" is a song performed by French DJ David Guetta, featuring vocals from American singer Chris Brown and rapper Lil Wayne, from Guetta's fifth studio album Nothing but the Beat. It was released as the sixth single from the album on April 23, 2012. Prior to its official release, the song charted in the lower regions of the charts in Canada, France, Germany, Netherlands, the United Kingdom, and the United States. Guetta, Brown and Wayne performed the song live for the first time at the 54th Grammy Awards on February 12, 2012.

Music video
The video was filmed on May 29, 2012, and premiered on July 2, 2012. It was directed by Colin Tilley. Guetta said how the video focuses more on futuristic images rather than on a plot as some of Guetta's other videos played out. It first opens up with Guetta walking into a room, and Brown appears in a mask as his eyes light up. As Brown starts singing in another scene, he is in a light-up suit. As the chorus plays, Brown is seen in a zero-gravity room. Guetta also then seen in the zero-gravity room. Wayne then is seen with a skateboard with a few other skateboarders in the background. Wayne is also located in another futuristic room. Brown is then seen in another room with a lit-up floor as he dances while he sings the chorus. Five other dancers join Brown.

Track listing

Charts and certifications

Weekly charts

Year-end charts

Certifications

Release history

References

2012 singles
David Guetta songs
Lil Wayne songs
Songs written by David Guetta
Songs written by Lil Wayne
Chris Brown songs
Music videos directed by Colin Tilley
Songs written by Nasri (musician)
Songs written by Chris Brown
Songs written by Frédéric Riesterer
Songs written by Giorgio Tuinfort
Song recordings produced by David Guetta
Songs written by Jacob Luttrell